A sustainability consultant is someone who advises businesses on methods to deliver their products or services in a sustainable manner (usually in an ecological sense). Corporate social responsibility (CSR) has grown to be a very specific field and includes focal areas like "green building, renewable energy, waste management and sustainable development."

Construction and Engineering
Sustainability consultants for building construction focus largely on the energy performance of a building: how much energy will be needed to heat, cool, or otherwise power a building, and how efficiently this energy can be recycled. They might also consult on the source of the energy if it will be from an alternative source.

One engineering technique to reduce energy usage is Passive Building Design.

Organisational culture and behaviour change
Research on the role of sustainability consultants in the UK found that there is a tendency to focus on technical aspects of building energy efficiency, facilities management and renewable technologies, but that consultants were aware of the need to support businesses on the ‘softer’ aspects of sustainability such as organisational culture and values.

Behavioural change initiatives can be effective in reducing emissions, and have multiple benefits including boosting staff morale, while research has found that collaboration between businesses can improve environmental performance.

Online tools are available to support sustainability consultants to broaden their skills.

Industry Associations 

 Accounting for Sustainability (A4S) 
American Sustainable Business Council (ASBC)
Chartered Institution of Building Services Engineers 
Institute of Environmental Management and Assessment 
The Association for the Advancement of Sustainability in Higher Education
The Climate Disclosure Standards Board (CDSB)
International Society for Sustainability Professionals (ISSP)
The Sustainability Consortium

See also 
 Environmental Consulting
 Green accounting
 Sustainable Development
 Environmental engineer
 Eco-capitalism

References 

Consultant
Consulting occupations